The 2014–15 Atlas season was the 68th professional season of Mexico's top-flight football league. The season is split into two tournaments—the Torneo Apertura and the Torneo Clausura—each with identical formats and each contested by the same eighteen teams. Atlas began their season on July 19, 2014, against Tigres UANL, Atlas played their homes games on Saturdays at 9:00pm local time.
Atlas qualify to the final phase in the Apertura tournament and was eliminated in the quarter-finals by Rayados de Monterrey.
Atlas qualify to the Copa Libertadores 2015.

Torneo Apertura

Squad

Regular season

Apertura 2014 results

Final phase

Goalscorers

Regular season

Final phase

Results

Results summary

Apertura 2014 Copa MX

Group stage

Apertura results

Knockout stage

Goalscorers

Torneo Clausura

First-team squad

Regular season

Clausura 2015 results

Final phase

Goalscorers

Regular season

Final phase

Results

Results summary

Copa Libertadores 2015

Group stage

Copa Libertadores results

Goalscorers

Club Atlas seasons
Mexican football clubs 2014–15 season